I Can't Think Straight is a 2008 novel by Shamim Sarif.

The novel has been successfully turned into an award-winning movie bearing the same title. The movie was produced by Hanan Kattan, Shamim's longtime partner and  successful entrepreneur. The movie had as main characters Lisa Ray and Sheetal Sheth, who were protagonists also in one of Shamim's other artistic projects, The World Unseen.

Plot summary

Spirited Christian Tala and shy Muslim Leyla could not be more different from each other, but the attraction is immediate and goes deeper than friendship. But Tala is not ready to accept the implications of the choice her heart has made for her and escapes back to Jordan, while Leyla tries to move on with her new-found life, to the shock of her tradition-loving parents.

External links
'I can't think straight anymore' book official website
'I can't think straight anymore' official UK movie trailer
'I can't think straight anymore' official US movie trailer

References

2008 British novels
British novels adapted into films